Uomo di pezza is an album by the Italian progressive rock band Le Orme. It was released in 1972 and was one of their best selling works, which won an Italian award disco d'oro.

Compared to the previous album, it shows many more classical elements: the opening of the album, for example, is a chaconne of Johann Sebastian Bach, played on piano by Gian Piero Reverberi. Furthermore, Tony Pagliuca plays a synthesizer for the first time.

The title Uomo di pezza means "rag doll man".  The doll character comes from the lyrics of the song "Gioco di bimba". The lyrics of Uomo di pezza describe a helpless masculine attitude, juxtaposed to an unknown, inscrutable feminine universe.

Track listing
All music and lyrics by Aldo Tagliapietra and Antonio Pagliuca.
Side 1
 "'Una dolcezza nuova"  - 5:31
 "Gioco di bimba"  - 2:56
 "La porta chiusa"  - 7:32
Side 2
 "Breve immagine"  - 2:45
 "Figure di cartone"  - 3:51
 "Aspettando l’alba"  - 4:45
 "Alienazione"  - 4:44

Personnel 
 Tony Pagliuca – keyboards
 Aldo Tagliapietra – voice, bass, guitars
 Michi Dei Rossi – drums, percussion
Guest
 Gian Piero Reverberi – piano on track 1

References

1972 albums
Le Orme albums
Italian-language albums